Deudorix lorisona, the coffee playboy, is a butterfly in the family Lycaenidae. It is found in Senegal, the Gambia, Guinea-Bissau, Guinea, Sierra Leone, Burkina Faso, Liberia, Ivory Coast, Ghana, Togo, Nigeria, Cameroon, Equatorial Guinea, São Tomé and Príncipe, Gabon, the Republic of the Congo, the Central African Republic, the Democratic Republic of the Congo, Sudan, Uganda, Ethiopia, Kenya, Burundi, Tanzania, Malawi, Zambia, Mozambique and Zimbabwe. The habitat consists of dense savanna and forests.

Adults are attracted to the flowers of Eupatorium species and adult males mud puddle. Adults are on wing year round, with a peak from April to August.

The larvae feed on Galiniera saxifraga, Mussaenda arcuata, Rothmannia fischeri, Keetia, Rutidea and Coffea species. It is considered a minor pest on cultivated coffee.

Subspecies
D. l. lorisona (Guinea, Sierra Leone, Burkina Faso, Liberia, Ivory Coast, Ghana, Togo, Nigeria: south and the Cross River loop, Cameroon, Equatorial Guinea, São Tomé and Príncipe: Principe, Gabon, Congo, Central African Republic, Uganda, Kenya: west of the Rift Valley, western Tanzania, Democratic Republic of the Congo: Uele, Tshopo, Equateur, Kinshasa, Sankuru, Lualaba and Shaba)
D. l. abriana Libert, 2004 (Senegal: Basse Casamance, Gambia, Guinea-Bissau, Guinea: Fouta Djalon)
D. l. baronica Ungemach, 1932 (Sudan, south-western Ethiopia, eastern Uganda, north-western Kenya, north-western Tanzania, north-eastern Democratic Republic of the Congo, Burundi)
D. l. coffea Jackson, 1966 (Kenya: east of the Rift Valley, Tanzania, Malawi, Zambia, Mozambique, Zimbabwe)
D. l. sesse Stempffer & Jackson, 1962 (Uganda: Sesse Isles, Lake Victoria)

References

External links
Die Gross-Schmetterlinge der Erde 13: Die Afrikanischen Tagfalter. Plate XIII 66 d

Butterflies described in 1862
Deudorix
Lepidoptera of Africa